The Gangneung Choi clan (Kangnung Choi, Kangnung Choe) (Hangul: 강릉최씨 is a Korean clan consisting of 510,000 people.  it was the 51st-largest in South Korea. As custom dictates, the oldest son always keeps the record of the family history.

History 

During the Joseon Dynasty, the Gangneung Choi clan had many nobles.

References